Louis Quinze is a 1/36 scale model of a ship of the line of the French Navy, currently on display at the Musée national de la Marine. No actual ship of the French Navy bore the name or was built to these specifications.

History 
Louis Quinze depicts a 110-gun ship of the line, the strongest type built in France in the late 17th century. The model is attributed to one of the model workshops of the shipyards of the Navy, and dated to around 1720.

The model is lavishly decorated, a feature characteristic of prestige warships of the Louis XIV era. It served as educational support for royal princes, including the actual Louis XV when he was still heir to the throne.

The model features unrealistic details, notably archaisms and English manierism that were in fashion when it was made.

Sources and references 
 Notes

References

 Bibliography
 
 

External links
 
 

Fictional ships of the French Navy